German submarine U-745 was a Type VIIC U-boat built for Nazi Germany's Kriegsmarine for service during World War II, and which was lost at sea on 31 January 1945.

U-745 was launched on 16 April 1943, under the command of Oberleutnant zur See Wilhelm von Trotha, who would remain its commanding officer for its entire service. U-745 had a crew of 45.

Design
German Type VIIC submarines were preceded by the shorter Type VIIB submarines. U-745 had a displacement of  when at the surface and  while submerged. She had two shafts and two  propellers.

U-745 was fitted with five  torpedo tubes (four fitted at the bow and one at the stern), fourteen torpedoes, one  SK C/35 naval gun, 220 rounds, and two twin  C/30 anti-aircraft guns. The boat had a complement of between forty-four and sixty.

Service history
She undertook four patrols during her service, and sank one allied auxiliary ship, the Soviet minesweeping trawler T-45 Antikajnen (No. 48), and one allied warship, the Soviet fleet minesweeper T-76 Korall.

Fate

Wilhelm von Trotha's body was later found near Föglö, Finland, and was buried three days later. No other bodies were recovered. Unlike most U-boats, which suffered casualties during the course of service due to accidents or other causes, U-745 suffered no casualties at all, until the time of her disappearance.

In late 2012 the Finnish diving team 'Badewanne', after 10 years of searching, reported they had found both  and U-745 in the Gulf of Finland south of Hanko.

Summary of raiding history

References

Notes

Citations

Bibliography

External links

World War II submarines of Germany
German Type VIIC submarines
U-boats sunk in 1945
1943 ships
Ships built in Danzig
U-boats commissioned in 1943
World War II shipwrecks in the Baltic Sea
Shipwrecks in the Gulf of Finland
Ships built by Schichau
U-boats sunk by mines
Ships lost with all hands
U-boat accidents